Pierre André (born 29 June 1947 in Buire) is a former member of the Senate of France, who represented the Aisne department.  He is a member of the Union for a Popular Movement.

References
Page on the Senate website

1947 births
Living people
Sciences Po alumni
People from Aisne
Rally for the Republic politicians
Union for a Popular Movement politicians
Gaullism, a way forward for France
French Senators of the Fifth Republic
Senators of Aisne
Mayors of places in Hauts-de-France